An education ministry is a national or subnational government agency politically responsible for education. Various other names are commonly used to identify such agencies, such as Ministry of Education, Department of Education, and Ministry of Public Education, and the head of such an agency may be a minister of education or secretary of education. Such agencies typically address educational concerns such as the quality of schools or standardization of curriculum. The first such ministry ever is considered to be the Commission of National Education, founded in 1773 in the Polish–Lithuanian Commonwealth. Following is a list of education ministries by country:

Africa 
 Ministry of National Education (Algeria)
 Ministry of Education (Egypt)
 Ministry of Education (Ethiopia)
 Ministry of Education (Ghana)
 Ministry of Education (Kenya)
 Ministry of Education (Namibia)
 Nigeria:
 Federal Ministry of Education (Nigeria)
 Rivers State: Rivers State Ministry of Education
 Ministry of Education (Rhodesia) (1965-1979)
 Ministry of Education (Rwanda)
 Ministry of Education (Sierra Leone)
 Ministry of Education (Somalia)
 Ministry of Education and Science (Somaliland)
 South Africa: Department of Education (South Africa) or the former Bantu Education Department
 Minister of Education (South Africa), split in 2009 into:
 Minister of Basic Education
 Minister of Higher Education and Training
 Zambia:
 Ministry of General Education
 Ministry of Higher Education (Zambia)
 Ministry of Education, Sport and Culture (Zimbabwe)

Asia 
 Ministry of Education (Afghanistan)
 Ministry of Education (Bahrain)
 Bangladesh:
 Ministry of Primary and Mass Education
 Ministry of Education (Bangladesh)
 Ministry of Education (Brunei)
 Ministry of Education (Myanmar)
 Ministry of Education (Bhutan)
 China:
 Ministry of Education (Mainland China)
 Education Bureau (Hong Kong)
 East Timor:
 Ministry of Education, Youth and Sport (East Timor)
 Ministry of Higher Education, Science and Culture (East Timor)
 Ministry of Education (India)
 Indonesia:
 Formal education: Ministry of Education, Culture, Research, and Technology (Indonesia)
 Religious education: Ministry of Religious Affairs (Indonesia)
 Ministry of Education (Iran)
 Ministry of Education (Iraq)
 Ministry of Education (Israel)
 Ministry of Education, Culture, Sports, Science and Technology (Japan)
 Ministry of Education (Jordan)
 
 Ministry of Education (Republic of Korea)
 Ministry of Education (Laos)
 Ministry of Education (Lebanon)
 Malaysia:
 Ministry of Education (Malaysia)
 Ministry of Higher Education (Malaysia)
 Ministry of Education (Maldives)
 Ministry of Education (Nepal)
 Ministry of Education (Pakistan)
 Ministry of Education (Palestine)
 Department of Education (Philippines)
 Ministry of Education (Saudi Arabia)
 Ministry of Education (Singapore)
 Ministry of Education (Sri Lanka)
 Ministry of Education (Taiwan)
 Ministry of Education (Thailand)
 Ministry of National Education (Turkey)

Central America 
 Belize: Ministry of Education, Youth, Sports and Culture
 Costa Rica: Ministry of Education (Costa Rica)
 El Salvador: Ministry of Education (El Salvador)
 Guatemala: Ministry of Education (Guatemala)
 Honduras: Secretariat of Education (Honduras)
 Nicaragua: Ministry of Education (Nicaragua)
 Panama: Ministry of Education (Panama)

Europe 
 Austria: Ministry of Education, Science and Culture
Azerbaijan: Ministry of Education
 Belgium
 Flanders: Flemish Ministry of Education and Training
 French Community: General Administration for Education and Scientific Research of the Ministry of the French Community
 German-speaking Community: Ministry for German-speaking Community
 Bosnia and Herzegovina: 
Bulgaria: Ministry of Education, Youth and Science
 Croatia: Ministry of Science, Education and Sports
 Czech: Ministry of Education, Youth and Sport
 Denmark: Ministry of Science, Technology and Innovation
 Estonia: Ministry of Education and Research
 Faroe Islands: Ministry of Education, Research and Culture
 Finland: Ministry of Education
 France: Ministry of National Education
 Germany: Federal Ministry of Education and Research
 Greece: Ministry of Education and Religious Affairs
 Ireland: 
 Department of Education 
 Department of Further and Higher Education, Research, Innovation and Science
 Italy: Ministry of Education, Universities and Research
 Merged from Ministry of Public Education (Italy) in 2008
 Latvia: Ministry of Science and Education
Lithuania: Ministry of Education and Science
 Luxembourg: Ministry of National Education
Montenegro: Ministry of Education
 Netherlands: Ministry of Education, Culture and Science
 Norway: Ministry of Education and Research
 Poland: Commission of National Education
 Ministry of Education (Poland)
 Portugal: Ministry of Education
 Romania: Ministry of National Education
 Russia: Ministry of Education and Science
 Formerly Ministry of Education (Soviet Union)
 Serbia: Ministry of Education, Science and Technological Development
Slovakia: 
 Slovenia: Ministry of Education, Science and Sport (Slovenia)
 Spain: Ministry of Education
 Sweden: Ministry of Education and Research
 Ukraine: Ministry of Education
 United Kingdom:
 England: Department for Education, previously Department for Education and Skills and Ministry of Education
 Northern Ireland: Department of Education (Northern Ireland)
 Scotland: Scottish Government Education Directorates
Wales: Department for Education and Skills

North America 
 Ministry of Education (Bahamas)
 Canada: no federal ministry, see Education in Canada:
 Alberta
 British Columbia
 Manitoba
 New Brunswick
 Newfoundland and Labrador
 Northwest Territories
 Nova Scotia
 Nunavut
 Ontario
 Prince Edward Island
 Quebec
 Saskatchewan
 Yukon
 Ministry of Education (Jamaica)
Ministry of Education, Technological & Vocational Training (Barbados) 
 Secretariat of Public Education (Mexico)
 Ministry of Education (Saint Lucia)
 Ministry of Education and National Reconciliation (Saint Vincent and the Grenadines)
 United States: United States Department of Education, headed by the United States secretary of education
 Many U.S. states also have a state-level department of education
 Secretary of Education of Puerto Rico

Oceania 
 Australia:
 Department of Education, Skills and Employment (2020 - )
 Antecedents:
 Department of Education (Australia) (2019 - 2020)
Department of Education and Training (Australia) (2014-2019)
 Department of Education (Australia, 2013–14)
 For earlier antecedents, see Preceding departments
 State government departments:
 New South Wales: Department of Education (New South Wales)
 Victoria: Department of Education and Training (Victoria)
 Queensland: Department of Education (Queensland)
 South Australia: Department for Education (South Australia)
 Tasmania: Department of Education (Tasmania)
 Western Australia: Department of Education (Western Australia)
 Australian Capital Territory: Education and Training Directorate
 Northern Territory: Department of Education (Northern Territory)
 Kiribati : Ministry of Education (Kiribati)
 New Zealand: 
Ministry of Education (New Zealand)
Antecedents:
Department of Education (New Zealand)
 Marshall Islands: Ministry of Education (Marshall Islands)

South America 
 Ministry of Education (Argentina)
Ministry of Education (Bolivia)
 Ministry of Education (Brazil)
 Ministry of Education (Chile)
 Ministry of National Education (Colombia)
 Ministry of Education (Peru)

See also 
 Right to science and culture
 Human rights
 Right to education
 Right to an adequate standard of living
 Welfare rights
 Right to education
 Economic, social and cultural rights
 Culture minister
 Cultural genocide
 Education minister
 Ministry of Culture and Tourism (disambiguation)
 Ministry of Education and Culture
 Education

References

Ministries

Education policy
Lists of government ministries